Baseball was contested at the 1946 Central American and Caribbean Games in Baranquilla, Colombia.

References
 

1946 Central American and Caribbean Games
1946
1946
Central American and Caribbean Games